Alsace–Lorraine, now called Alsace–Moselle, is a historical region located in modern day France. It was created in 1871 by the German Empire after it had seized the region from the Second French Empire in the Franco-Prussian War with the Treaty of Frankfurt. Alsace–Lorraine reverted to French ownership in 1918 as part of the Treaty of Versailles and Germany's defeat in World War I.

The Empire annexed most of Alsace and the Moselle department of Lorraine, following its victory in the Franco-Prussian War. The Alsatian part lay in the Rhine Valley on the west bank of the Rhine River, east of the Vosges Mountains; the section originally in Lorraine was in the upper Moselle valley to the north of the Vosges.

The territory encompassed almost all of Alsace (93%) and over a quarter of Lorraine (26%), while the rest of these regions remained parts of France. For historical reasons, specific legal dispositions are still applied in the territory in the form of a "local law in Alsace–Moselle". In relation to its special legal status, since reversion to France, the territory has been referred to administratively as Alsace–Moselle.

Since 2016, the historical territory has been part of the French administrative region of Grand Est.

Geography
Its capital was Straßburg. It was divided in three districts (Bezirke in German):

Towns and cities
The largest urban areas in Alsace–Lorraine at the 1910 census were:
 Straßburg (now Strasbourg): 220,883 inhabitants
 Mülhausen (Mulhouse): 128,190 inhabitants
 Metz: 102,787 inhabitants
 Diedenhofen (Thionville): 69,693 inhabitants
 Colmar: 44,942 inhabitants

History

Background

The modern history of Alsace–Lorraine was largely influenced by the rivalry between French and German nationalism.

France long sought to attain and then preserve what it considered to be its "natural boundaries", which it considered the Pyrenees to the southwest, the Alps to the southeast, and the Rhine River to the northeast. These strategic claims led to the annexation of territories located west of the Rhine river in the Holy Roman Empire. These border-changes, at the time, meant more or less that one ruler (the local princes and city-governments, with some remaining power of the Holy Roman Emperor) was exchanged for another (the King of France).

German nationalism on the other hand, which in its 19th century form originated as a reaction against the French occupation of large areas of Germany under Napoleon, sought to unify all the German-speaking populations of the former Holy Roman Empire into a single nation-state. As various German dialects were spoken by most of the population of Alsace and Moselle (northern Lorraine), these regions were viewed by German nationalists to be rightfully part of hoped-for united Germany in the future.

From annexation to World War I

In 1871, the newly created German Empire's demand for Alsace from France after its victory in the Franco-Prussian War was not simply a punitive measure. The transfer was controversial even among the Germans: The German Chancellor, Otto von Bismarck, was initially opposed to it, as he thought (correctly) it would engender permanent French enmity toward Germany. Some German industrialists did not want the competition from Alsatian industries, such as the cloth makers who would be exposed to competition from the sizeable industry in Mulhouse. Karl Marx also warned his fellow Germans:
 "If Alsace and Lorraine are taken, then France will later make war on Germany in conjunction with Russia. It is unnecessary to go into the unholy consequences."

Bismarck and the South German industrialists proposed to have Alsace ceded to Switzerland, while Switzerland would compensate Germany with another territory. The Swiss rejected the proposal, preferring to remain neutral between the French and Germans.

The German Emperor, Wilhelm I, eventually sided with army commander Helmuth von Moltke, other Prussian generals and other officials who argued that a westward shift in the French border was necessary for strategic military and ethnographic reasons. From a linguistic perspective, the transfer involved people who for the most part spoke Alemannic German dialects. At the time, ethnic identity was often based primarily on language, unlike the more multifaceted approach focusing on self identification in use today. From a military perspective, by early 1870s standards, shifting the frontier away from the Rhine would give the Germans a strategic buffer against feared future French attacks. Due to the annexation, the Germans gained control of the fortifications of  Metz and Strasbourg (Straßburg) on the left bank of the Rhine and most of the iron resources of Lorraine.

Creating a new Imperial Territory out of formerly French territory would achieve this goal: Although a Reichsland would not technically be part of the Kingdom of Prussia, being governed directly by the Empire (headed by the King of Prussia as Emperor, and the minister-president of Prussia as Imperial Chancellor) would in practical terms amount to the same thing. Thus, by annexing Alsace–Lorraine, Berlin was able to avoid complications with Baden and Bavaria on matters such as new fortifications.

Memory of the Napoleonic Wars was still fresh in the 1870s. Wilhelm I himself had had to flee with the Prussian royal family to East Prussia as a nine year old in 1806 and had served in the Battle of Waterloo. Until the Franco-Prussian War, the French had maintained a long-standing desire to establish their entire eastern frontier on the Rhine, and thus they were viewed by most 19th century Germans as an aggressive and acquisitive people. In the years before 1870 the Germans feared the French more than the French feared the Germans. Many Germans at the time thought that the creation of the new Empire in itself would be enough to earn permanent French enmity, and thus desired a defensible border with their long-standing enemy. Any additional enmity that would be earned from territorial concessions was downplayed as marginal and insignificant in the overall scheme of things.

The annexed area consisted of the northern part of Lorraine, along with Alsace.
 The area around the town of Belfort (now the French Territoire de Belfort) was unaffected, because Belfort had been defended by Colonel Denfert-Rochereau, who surrendered only after receiving orders from Paris, and was compensated by another territory.
 The town of Montbéliard and its surrounding area to the south of Belfort, which have been part of the Doubs department since 1816, and therefore were not considered part of Alsace, were not included, although they were a Protestant enclave belonging to Württemberg from 1397–1806.

This area corresponded to the present French départements of Bas-Rhin (in its entirety), Haut-Rhin (except the area of Belfort and Montbéliard), and a small northeast section of the Vosges département, all of which made up Alsace, and most of the départements of Moselle (four-fifths of Moselle) and the northeast of Meurthe (one-third of Meurthe), which were the eastern part of Lorraine.

The remaining two-thirds of the département of Meurthe and the westernmost one-fifth of Moselle, which had escaped German annexation were joined to form the new French département of Meurthe-et-Moselle.

The new border between France and Germany mainly followed the geolinguistic divide between French and German dialects, except in a few valleys of the Alsatian side of the Vosges mountains, the city of Metz and its region and in the area of Château-Salins (formerly in the Meurthe département), which were annexed by Germany although most people there spoke French. In 1900, 11.6% of the population of Alsace–Lorraine spoke French as their first language (11.0% in 1905, 10.9% in 1910).

That small francophone areas were affected was used in France to denounce the new border as hypocrisy, since Germany had justified the annexation on linguistic grounds. The German administration was tolerant of the use of the French language (in sharp contrast to the use of the Polish language in the Province of Posen), and French was permitted as an official language and school language in those areas where it was spoken by a majority. This changed in 1914 with the First World War.

The Treaty of Frankfurt gave the residents of the region until 1 October 1872, to choose between emigrating to France or remaining in the region and having their nationality legally changed to German. About 161,000 people, or around 10.4% of the Alsace–Lorraine population, opted for French citizenship (the so-called Optanden); but, only about 50,000 actually emigrated, while the rest acquired German citizenship.

The sentiment of attachment to France stayed strong at least during the first 16 years of the annexation. During the Reichstag elections, the 15 deputies of 1874, 1881, 1884 (but one) and 1887 were called protester deputies because they expressed to the Reichstag their opposition to the annexation by means of the 1874 motion in the French language:
 "May it please the Reichstag to decide that the populations of Alsace–Lorraine that were annexed, without having been consulted, to the German Reich by the treaty of Frankfurt be asked to adjudicate on this annexation."
The abusive and oppressive behaviour by the German military towards the population of the town of Saverne (the Saverne Affair, usually known in English-language accounts as the Zabern Affair) led to protests not just in Alsace, but in other regions, which put a severe strain on the relationship between the people of Alsace–Lorraine and the rest of the German Empire.

The area was administered directly from Berlin, but was granted limited autonomy in 1911.

Reichstag election results 1874–1912

FVp: Progressive People's Party. formed in 1910 as a merger of all leftist liberal parties.

During World War I

In French foreign policy, the demand for the return of Alsace and Lorraine faded in importance after 1880 with the decline of the monarchist element. When the World War broke out in 1914, recovery of the two lost provinces became the top French war goal.

In the early 20th century, the increased militarization of Europe, and the lack of negotiation between major powers, led to harsh and rash actions taken by both sides in respect to Alsace–Lorraine during World War I. As soon as war was declared, both the French and German authorities used the inhabitants of Alsace–Lorraine as propaganda pawns. 

Germans living in France were arrested and placed into camps by the French authorities. Upon occupying certain villages, veterans of the 1870 conflict were sought out and arrested by the French army.

The Germans responded to the outbreak of war with harsh measures against the Alsace–Lorraine populace: the Saverne Affair had convinced the high command that the population was hostile to the German Empire and that it should be forced into submission. German troops occupied some homes. The German military feared French partisans – or francs-tireurs, as they had been called during the Franco-Prussian War – would reappear.

German authorities developed policies aimed at reducing the influence of French. In Metz, French street names, which had been displayed in French and German, were suppressed in January 1915. Six months later, on 15 July 1915, German became the only official language in the region, leading to the Germanization of the towns’ names effective 2 September 1915.

Prohibiting the speaking of French in public further increased the exasperation of some of the natives, who were long accustomed to mixing their conversation with French language (see code-switching); still, the use even of one word, as innocent as "bonjour", could incur a fine. Some ethnic Germans in the region cooperated in the persecution as a way to demonstrate German patriotism.

German authorities became increasingly worried about renewed French nationalism. The Reichsland governor stated in February 1918: "Sympathies towards France and repulsion for Germans have penetrated to a frightening depth the petty bourgeoisie and the peasantry". But in order to spare them possible confrontations with relatives in France but also to avoid any desertion from the Alsatian soldiers to the French army, German Army draftees from Alsace–Lorraine were sent mainly to the Eastern front, or the Navy. About 15,000 Alsatians and Lorrainers served in the German Navy.

Annexation to the French Republic

In the general revolutionary atmosphere of the expiring German Empire, Marxist councils of workers and soldiers formed in Mulhouse, Colmar, and Strasbourg in November 1918, in imitation of the soviets of revolutionary Russia, and in parallel to other such bodies set up in Germany.

The soviet councils disbanded themselves with the departure of the German troops between 11 and 17 November. The arrival of the French Army stabilized the situation: French troops put the region under military occupation and entered Strasbourg on 5 November. The "Nationalrat" proclaimed the annexation of Alsace to France on 5 December, but this action was not internationally recognized until the Treaty of Versailles was concluded in 1919.

France divided Alsace–Lorraine into the départements of Haut-Rhin, Bas-Rhin, and Moselle (the same political structure as before the annexation and as created by the French Revolution, with slightly different limits). Even today, laws in these three regions are somewhat different from the rest of France – these specific provisions are known as the local law in Alsace–Moselle.

The département Meurthe-et-Moselle was maintained even after France recovered Alsace–Lorraine in 1919. The area of Belfort became a special-status area and was not reintegrated into Haut-Rhin in 1919 but instead was made a full-status département in 1922 under the name Territoire-de-Belfort.

The French Government immediately started a Francization campaign that included the forced deportation of all Germans who had settled in the area after 1870. For that purpose, the population was divided in four categories:  (French citizens before 1870),  (descendants of such French citizens),  (citizens of Allied or neutral states), and  (enemy aliens – Germans). By July 1921, 111,915 people categorized as "" were expelled to Germany. All place names were francizised (e.g., Straßburg → Strasbourg, Mülhausen → Mulhouse, Schlettstadt → Sélestat, etc.).

World War II

Evacuation and deportations

On 1 September 1939, residents of Alsace and Moselle living in the Franco-German border region were evacuated. This comprised about one third of the population of Alsace and Moselle, or about 600,000 residents. The evacuation was aimed at providing space for military operations and for protecting citizens from attack. The evacuees were allowed to return in July 1940, after France surrendered to Germany.

The area then came under German occupation. Nazi laws against homosexuality were applied to Alsace–Moselle, and homosexuals were deported. The Nazis also deported refugee and resident Jews.

German control and the Malgré-nous

After the defeat of France in the spring of 1940, Alsace and Moselle were not formally annexed by Nazi Germany. Although the terms of the armistice specified that the integrity of the whole French territory could not be modified in any way, Adolf Hitler, the German Führer, drafted an annexation law in 1940 that he kept secret, expecting to announce it in the event of a German victory. Through a series of laws which individually seemed minor, Berlin took de facto control of Alsace–Lorraine, and Alsatians–Lorrainians could be drafted into the German Army. During the occupation, Moselle was integrated into a Reichsgau named Westmark and Alsace was amalgamated with Baden. Beginning in 1942, people from Alsace and Moselle were made German citizens by decree of the Nazi government.

Beginning in October 1942, young Alsatian and Lorrainian men were inducted into the German armed forces. A small minority volunteered, notably the author of The Forgotten Soldier, known by the pseudonym Guy Sajer. Ultimately, 100,000 Alsatians and 30,000 Mosellans were enrolled, many of them to fight against the Soviet Red Army, on Germany's Eastern Front. Most of those who survived the war were interned in Tambov in Russia in 1945.

Speaking French was prohibited under German occupation, and learning German was obligatory.

Demographics

First language (1900)
 German and Germanic dialects: 1,492,347 (86.8%)
 Other languages: 219,638 (12.8%)
 French and Romance dialects: 198,318 (11.5%)
 Italian: 18,750 (1.1%)
 German and a second language: 7,485 (0.4%)
 Polish: 1,410 (0.1%)

Religion
When Alsace and the Lorraine department became part of Germany, the French laws regarding religious bodies were preserved, with special privileges to the then recognised religions of Calvinism, Judaism, Lutheranism and Roman Catholicism, under a system known as the Concordat. However, the Roman Catholic dioceses of Metz and of Strasbourg became exempt jurisdictions. The Church of Augsburg Confession of France, with its directory, supreme consistory and the bulk of its parishioners residing in Alsace, was reorganised as the Protestant Church of Augsburg Confession of Alsace and Lorraine (EPCAAL) in 1872, but territorially reconfined to Alsace–Lorraine only. The five local Calvinist consistories, originally part of the Reformed Church of France, formed a statewide synod in 1895, the Protestant Reformed Church of Alsace and Lorraine (EPRAL). All the mentioned religious bodies retained the status as établissements publics de culte (public bodies of Religion). When the new Alsace–Lorraine constitution of 1911 provided for a bicameral state parliament each recognised religion was entitled to send a representative into the first chamber of the Landtag as ex officio members (the bishops of Strasbourg and of Metz, the presidents of EPCAAL and EPRAL, and a delegate of the three Israelite consistories).

Religious statistics in 1910
Population 1,874,014:
 Catholic: 76.22%
 Protestant: 21.78% (18.87% Lutherans, 2.91% Calvinists)
 Jewish: 1.63%
 Other Christian: 0.21%
 Atheist: 0.12%

Statistics (1866–2018)

Languages

Both Germanic and Romance dialects were traditionally spoken in Alsace–Lorraine before the 20th century.

Germanic dialects:
 Central German dialects:
 Luxembourgish Franconian aka Luxembourgish in the north-west of Moselle (Lothringen) around Thionville (Diddenuewen in the local Luxembourgish dialect) and Sierck-les-Bains (Siirk in the local Luxembourgish dialect).
 Moselle Franconian in the central northern part of Moselle around Boulay-Moselle (Bolchin in the local Moselle Franconian dialect) and Bouzonville (Busendroff in the local Moselle Franconian dialect).
 Rhine Franconian in the north-east of Moselle around Forbach (Fuerboch in the local Rhine Franconian dialect), Bitche (Bitsch in the local Rhine Franconian dialect), and Sarrebourg (Saarbuerj in the local Rhine Franconian dialect), as well as in the north-west of Alsace around Sarre-Union (Buckenum in the local Rhine Franconian dialect) and La Petite-Pierre (Lítzelstain in the local Rhine Franconian dialect).
 Transitional between Central German and Upper German:
 South Franconian in the northernmost part of Alsace around Wissembourg (Waisseburch in the local South Franconian dialect).
 Upper German dialects:
 Alsatian in the largest part of Alsace and in a few villages around Phalsbourg in the extreme south-east of Moselle. Alsatian was the most spoken dialect in Alsace–Lorraine.
 High Alemannic in the southernmost part of Alsace, around Saint-Louis and Ferrette (Pfirt in the local High Alemannic dialect).

Romance dialects (belonging to the langues d'oïl like French):
 Lorrain in roughly the southern half of Moselle, including its capital Metz, as well as in some valleys of the Vosges Mountains in the west of Alsace around Schirmeck and Sainte-Marie-aux-Mines.
 Franc-Comtois in 12 villages in the extreme south-west of Alsace.

See also
 Alsace–Lorraine Regional Party
 Independent Regional Party for Alsace–Lorraine
 Unification of Germany
 Gare de Metz-Ville
 German Lorraine
 Moselle (department)

Notes

References

Further reading
 
 Bankwitz, Philip Charles Farwell. Alsatian autonomist leaders, 1919-1947 (UP of Kansas, 1978).
 Byrnes, Joseph F. "The relationship of religious practice to linguistic culture: language, religion, and education in Alsace and the Roussillon, 1860–1890." Church History 68#3 (1999): 598–626.
 Harp, Stephen L. "Building the German nation. Primary schooling in Alsace–Lorraine, 1870–1918." Paedagogica Historica 32.supplement 1 (1996): 197–219.
 Hazen, Charles Downer. Alsace–Lorraine Under German Rule (New York: H. Holt, 1917). online; scholarly history
 Höpel, Thomas: The French-German Borderlands: Borderlands and Nation-Building in the 19th and 20th Centuries, European History Online, Mainz: Institute of European History, 2010, retrieved: December 17, 2012.
 Klein, Detmar. "German-Annexed Alsace and Imperial Germany: A Process of Colonisation?." in Róisín Healy and Enrico Dal Lago, eds.  The Shadow of Colonialism on Europe’s Modern Past (Palgrave Macmillan UK, 2014). 92-108.
 Putnam, Ruth. Alsace and Lorraine from Cæsar to Kaiser, 58 B.C.–1871 A.D. New York: G.P. Putnam's Sons, 1915.
 Seager, Frederic H.  "The Alsace–Lorraine Question in France, 1871-1914." in Charles K. Warner, ed., From the Ancien Regime to the Popular Front (1969): 111–126.
 Silverman, Dan P. Reluctant Union; Alsace–Lorraine and Imperial Germany, 1871-1918 (Pennsylvania State UP, 1972).
 Varley, Karine. Under the Shadow of Defeat (Palgrave Macmillan UK, 2008) pp. 175–202.

Other languages
 Baumann, Ansbert. « Die Erfindung des Grenzlandes Elsass-Lothringen », in: Burkhard Olschowsky (ed.), Geteilte Regionen – geteilte Geschichtskulturen? Muster der europäischen Identitätsbildung im europäischen Vergleich, Munich: Oldenbourg 2013, S. 163–183.
 Roth, François. Alsace–Lorraine, De 1870 À Nos Jours: Histoire d'un "pays perdu". Nancy: Place Stanislas, 2010. .

External links

 http://www.geocities.com/bfel/geschichte5b.html (Archived 2009-10-25) 
 http://www.elsass-lothringen.de/ 
 https://web.archive.org/web/20090730200508/http://geocities.com/CapitolHill/Rotunda/2209/Alsace_Lorraine.html
 France, Germany and the Struggle for the War-making Natural Resources of the Rhineland
 Elsass-Lothringen video
 Annuary of Cultur and Artists from Elsass-Lothringen 

History of Alsace
History of Lorraine
Alsace-Lorraine, Republic of
Political history of France
States and territories established in 1871
States of the German Empire
Treaty of Versailles
Geography of Grand Est